WXGR-LP (103.5 FM) is a non-profit low-power FM radio station licensed to serve Dover, New Hampshire.  The station is owned by Seacoast Community Radio, which acquired the broadcasting license in September 2019.

The station was assigned the WXGR call letters by the Federal Communications Commission on July 31, 2003. The station broadcasts from its tower site in Eliot, Maine, with an office and studio in Portsmouth, New Hampshire.  WXGR serves the Seacoast area of New Hampshire and southern Maine.

Programming
WXGR-LP airs an eclectic format that includes a variety of musical styles from all over the world.

See also
List of community radio stations in the United States

References

External links
 

XGR-LP
XGR-LP
Community radio stations in the United States
Dover, New Hampshire
Radio stations established in 2003